Frankie is a 2019 American-French drama film directed by Ira Sachs, from a screenplay by Sachs and Mauricio Zacharias. It stars Isabelle Huppert, Brendan Gleeson, Greg Kinnear, Marisa Tomei, and Jérémie Renier.

It had its world premiere at the 2019 Cannes Film Festival on May 20, 2019. It was released in France on August 28, 2019, by SBS Distribution, and in the United States on October 25, 2019, by Sony Pictures Classics.

Plot
Frankie, a well-known French actress, has only a few months to live. For that reason, she decides to spend her last vacation with her large family in Sintra (Portugal). Despite the picturesque location, the relatives present struggle with a variety of love, marriage and money problems.

Cast
 Isabelle Huppert as Frankie
 Greg Kinnear as Gary
 Marisa Tomei as Ilene
 Jérémie Renier as Paul
 Brendan Gleeson as Jimmy
 Vinette Robinson as Sylvia
 Ariyon Bakare as Ian
 Pascal Greggory as Michel
 Carloto Cotta as Tiago 
 Sennia Nanua as Maya

Production
In February 2018, it was announced Isabelle Huppert, Greg Kinnear, Marisa Tomei, Jérémie Renier and Andre Wilms had joined the cast of the film, with Ira Sachs directing the film, from a screenplay he wrote alongside Mauricio Zacharias. Saïd Ben Saïd and Michel Merkt will serve as producers on the film, while Lucas Joaquin and Kevin Chneiweiss will serve as executive producers under their Secret Engine and SBS Productions banners, respectively. In September 2018, Brendan Gleeson, Vinette Robinson, Ariyon Bakare, and Pascal Greggory joined the cast of the film.

Filming
Principal photography began in October 2018, primarily in the Portuguese Riviera.

Release
It had its world premiere at the Cannes Film Festival on May 20, 2019. Prior to, Sony Pictures Classics acquired U.S. distribution rights to the film. It was released in France on August 28, 2019. It is scheduled to be released in the United States on October 25, 2019.

Reception 
The website's critics consensus reads, "Flawed yet well-acted, Frankie finds director/co-writer Ira Sachs getting snagged in his story's thorny relationships -- and often freed by his stellar cast." Metacritic, which uses a weighted average, assigned the film a score of 56 out of 100, based on 27 critics, indicating "mixed or average reviews".

References

External links
 

2019 films
2019 drama films
2019 independent films
American drama films
French drama films
English-language French films
English-language Portuguese films
Sony Pictures Classics films
Films about vacationing
Films directed by Ira Sachs
Films set in Portugal
2010s English-language films
2010s French-language films
2019 multilingual films
American multilingual films
French multilingual films
2010s American films
2010s French films